Nils Dag Strømme (29 July 1945 – 5 March 2022) was a Norwegian boxer. He competed at the 1968 Summer Olympics and the 1972 Summer Olympics. At the 1972 Summer Olympics he lost to Gabriel Pometcu of Romania. Strømme died on 5 March 2022, at the age of 76.

References

External links

1945 births
2022 deaths
Norwegian male boxers
Olympic boxers of Norway
Boxers at the 1968 Summer Olympics
Boxers at the 1972 Summer Olympics
Sportspeople from Kristiansand
Featherweight boxers
20th-century Norwegian people